Neoregelia fluminensis is a species of flowering plant in the genus Neoregelia. This species is endemic to Brazil.

Cultivars
 Neoregelia 'Heat Wave'
 Neoregelia 'Rust Belt Special'

References

BSI Cultivar Registry Retrieved 11 October 2009

fluminensis
Flora of Brazil